Coleophora discifera is a moth of the family Coleophoridae. It is found in Mongolia.

References

discifera
Moths described in 1976
Moths of Asia